The Uruguayan Basketball Championship is the season by season national club championship of the top-tier level men's professional basketball competition in Uruguay.

History
Campeonato Uruguayo Federal de Básquetbol (Uruguayan Federal Basketball Championship): (1915–2003)
Liga Uruguaya de Básquetbol (Uruguayan Basketball League) (2003–present)

List of first division champions (Uruguayan Federal Basketball Championship)

There were two tournaments held in 1918.

Titles by club (Uruguayan Federal Basketball Championship)

List of first division champions (Uruguayan Basketball League)

Titles by club (Uruguayan Basketball League)

Total First Division titles by club

See also
Uruguayan Federal Basketball Championship (1915–2003)
Uruguayan Basketball League (2003–present)
Uruguayan Basketball Federation (FUBB)

References

External links
CAMPEONATOS DE PRIMERA DIVISION 
Uruguyan Basketball Federation FUBB official website 
Uruguayan Basketball League at Latinbasket.com 

1915 establishments in Uruguay
Basketball in Uruguay
Sports organizations established in 1915